This is a list of Singaporean billionaires  based on an annual assessment of wealth and assets compiled and published by Forbes magazine in 2021.
Most of them are businessmen. Many of them got their wealth from the real estate industry.

2021 Singaporean billionaires list

References

Lists of people by wealth
Net worth
 
Economy of Singapore-related lists